Abu Zenima is a coastal city in South Sinai Governorate, Egypt.

History
In 2009, a whale 10 metres long and weighing 10 tonnes was found on its Red Sea beach.  The minke whale was presumed to have lost its way from the Indian Ocean, and starved due to the relative lack of food.  The body was buried in lime, for public health reasons, with the intention of eventually displaying the skeleton in a visitor's centre.

Climate
Köppen climate classification system classifies its climate as hot desert (BWh), as the rest of Egypt.

See also 
 Abou Redis

References 

Populated places in South Sinai Governorate